Riptide is a 2022 British-Australian psychological thriller television series created by Jason Herbison and directed by Scott Major. It was broadcast over four consecutive days from 27 December 2022 on Channel 5 in the UK. The plot focuses on Alison, whose husband mysteriously disappears while surfing. Riptide stars Jo Joyner and Peter O'Brien. It was filmed in Melbourne, Australia in August 2022.

Plot
Alison has just married Australian Sean Weston. Both of their children struggle with the new family situation, and Alison's former husband wants her back. When Sean disappears during a morning surf, it is not clear if he got caught up in a rip tide or if there is more to his disappearance.

Cast
 Jo Joyner as Alison Weston
 Peter O'Brien as Sean Weston
 Ciarán Griffiths as Michael Lane
 David Berry as Dan Burrell/Simon Cameron
 Ben Turland as Ethan Weston
 Asher Yasbincek as Hannah Lane
 Ally Fowler as Rachel Weston
 Yazeed Daher as Logan Williams
 Sonya Suares as Sergeant Bhomik
 Pia Miranda as Jenny Clarke
 Benjamin Samaddar as Jesse Patel
 Max Brown as Finn Baker
 Patrick Harvey as Andrew White
 Patrick Williams as Philip Eldersly
 Emma Choy as Naomi Burrell
 Toby Lang as Constable Lang
 Ashley Stocco as Detective Abela
 Adam McConvell as Detective Da Silva
 Judy Beaumont as Sara Wiseman
 Hannah Ogawa as Melody Ling
Scott Major as Daniel Burrell

Production
The series was commissioned following the success of Lie With Me (2021). It is one of two drama commissions for Channel 5 made by Fremantle Australia in partnership with Australia's Network Ten. Riptide was created by Jason Herbison, who is also producing the series alongside Natalie Mandel. Herbison commented: "I'm thrilled to continue the partnership with Channel 5 and 10 and to bring Riptide to life. It's the best of British meeting the best of Australian casts and crews – and I can't wait for the audience to see what we have in store." The scripts have been by written by Herbison, Margaret Wilson, and Anthony Ellis.

The cast were revealed on 14 July 2022. British actress Jo Joyner plays Alison Weston. She described Alison as "a warm and layered character whose world is turned upside down, just when it seemed like her life was finally coming together." Peter O'Brien is Sean Weston, Alison's Australian husband. Ciarán Griffiths plays Alison's former husband Michael Lane, and David Berry is the Weston's neighbour Dan Burrell. Ben Turland and Asher Yasbincek play Alison and Sean's children Ethan and Hannah respectively. Other cast members include Ally Fowler as Sean's former wife Rachel Weston, Pia Miranda as Jenny Clarke, Yazeed Daher as Hannah's friend Logan Williams, Benjamin Samaddar as Jesse Patel, and Sonya Suares as Sergeant Bhomik. Additional cast include Max Brown as Finn Baker, Patrick Harvey as Andrew White, Patrick Williams as Philip Eldersly, Emma Choy as Naomi Burrell, Toby Lang as Constable Lang, Ashley Stocco as Detective Abela, Adam McConvell as Detective Da Silva, Judy Beaumont as Sara, and Hannah Ogawa as Melody Ling.

Riptide was directed by Scott Major. Production on the four-part series began in early August 2022, and concluded on 22 August. It was filmed on-location in Melbourne and Victoria. Some scenes were filmed at the Network 10 studios in Nunawading, previously used by the Australian soap opera Neighbours. The series received funding from VicScreen. 

A promotional trailer for the show was released in November 2022. Riptide was broadcast across four consecutive nights from 27 December 2022 in the UK. It will air on Network 10 in 2023 in Australia.

Episodes

Reception
Ahead of the first episode being broadcast, Morgan Cormack of the Radio Times said the series had caught their attention and thought it "looks positively ominous" from the teaser trailer. In her review of the series, Cormack's colleague Jane Rackham called it "intriguing" and stated: "Initially it has all the hallmarks of an upmarket version of Neighbours... until Sean disappears while out for his daily surf. The briefly glimpsed flashbacks suggest it maybe wasn't an accident."

Emily Watkins of the i gave Riptide three out of five stars. In her mixed review, Watkins wrote "Certainly, there was no shortage of narrative meat to sink your teeth into. While Riptide sometimes seemed to have bitten off more than it could chew – at Sean's funeral, for instance, where all those antagonists collided – its well-paced writing and confident performances meant that any instances of overreaching were short-lived and easily forgiven." Watkins thought the characters were mostly unlikeable, but praised O'Brien and Joyner's performances for giving the series "much needed depth." She added that "the first episode of Riptide promised a lot. Let's hope the next three episodes can deliver."

In a negative review, James Jackson from The Times gave the show two out of five stars and said "Jo Joyner does furrowed brow to perfection but this down under drama of sun, surf and suspense is no eye-catcher." Jackson also likened the show to "a dark Neighbours special, and not in a particularly fun way."

References

External links

Riptide at My5

2022 British television series debuts
2022 British television series endings
2020s British drama television series
2022 Australian television series debuts
2022 Australian television series endings
2020s Australian drama television series
Television shows set in Melbourne
Network 10 original programming
English-language television shows
Television episodes written by Jason Herbison
Television series by Fremantle (company)